Cláudia Maria Patitucci Jimenez (18 November 1958 – 20 August 2022) was a Brazilian actress, comedienne and screenwriter. She started her career in 1979 in the TV show Malu Mulher, but it was from the 1980s onwards that she began to stand out, working with humour in shows such as Os Trapalhões, Viva O Gordo and Chico Anysio Show.

In the 1990s, she stood out in the film O Corpo, playing Bia, a character that won her Best Actress at the Brasilia Film Festival. In the same period, she had a prominent role in the humorous Escolinha do Professor Raimundo as Cacilda. Later, she joined the cast of Sai de Baixo to play Edileuza; as well, she gave life to the character Glorinha in Zorra Total. In 2004, she was the protagonist of Sitcom.br, a feature of Fantástico until she stood out in the TV show Sete Pecados, in which she received two nominations for the Contigo! Award 2008 in the categories of Best Supporting Actress and Best Romantic Couple.

Biography 
Born in Rio de Janeiro on 18 November 1958, Jimenez graduated from a normal school with a kindergarten degree and studied amateur theatre at Tijuca Tênis Clube.

In 1978, she made her professional theatre debut, playing the prostitute Mimi Bibelô in the first production of Ópera do Malandro, by Chico Buarque, alongside Ary Fontoura and Marieta Severo. Producer Maurício Shermann saw her in the play and invited her to go to TV Globo. Cláudia was invited to participate in the opening of the program Viva o Gordo and soon joined the cast of the program, where she remained for four years. Simultaneously, she also participated in the program Os Trapalhões. Her comic performance caught the attention of Chico Anysio, who invited her to act in several of his programs, such as Chico Anysio Show and Escolinha do Professor Raimundo. Alongside Chico, she played several characters, such as the nymphomaniac Pureza, the sadistic nurse Alda and the  flirtatious student Dona Cacilda, a parody of the presenter Xuxa, with the catchphrase Beijinho-Beijinho Pau-Pau!.

Jimenez died on 20 August 2022, at the age of 63.

Selected filmography

References

External links
 

1958 births
2022 deaths
20th-century Brazilian actresses
21st-century Brazilian actresses
Brazilian film actresses
Brazilian stage actresses
Brazilian television actresses
Actresses from Rio de Janeiro (city)
Brazilian women comedians
Brazilian women screenwriters
20th-century comedians
21st-century comedians